The chickpea or chick pea (Cicer arietinum) is an annual legume of the family Fabaceae, subfamily Faboideae. Its different types are variously known as gram or Bengal gram, chhana, chana, or channa, garbanzo or garbanzo bean, or Egyptian pea.  Chickpea seeds are high in protein. It is one of the earliest cultivated legumes, and 9500-year-old remains have been found in the Middle East.

The chickpea is a key ingredient in Mediterranean and Middle Eastern cuisines, used in hummus, and, when ground into flour, falafel. It also is important in Indian cuisine, used in salads, soups and stews, and curry, in chana masala, and in other food products that contain channa (chickpeas). In 2019, India was responsible for 70% of global chickpea production.

Etymology
The name "chickpea," earlier "chiche pease," is modelled on Middle French , where chiche comes from Latin . "Chich" was used by itself in English from the 14th to the 18th centuries. The word , from an alteration of Old Spanish , came first to English as "garvance" in the 17th century, being gradually anglicized to "calavance", though that came to refer to a variety of other beans, including the hyacinth bean. The current form garbanzo comes directly from modern Spanish.

History
Cicer reticulatum is the wild progenitor of chickpeas and currently grows only in southeast Turkey, where they are believed to have been domesticated, which can be dated to around 7000 BC. Domesticated chickpeas have been found at Pre-Pottery Neolithic B sites in Turkey and the Levant, namely at Çayönü, Hacilar, and Tell es-Sultan (Jericho). Chickpeas then spread to the Mediterranean region around 6000 BC and India around 3000 BC.

In southern France, Mesolithic layers in a cave at L'Abeurador, Hérault, have yielded chickpeas, carbon-dated to 6790±90 BC. They were found in the late Neolithic (about 3500 BC) sites at Thessaly, Kastanas, Lerna and Dimini, Greece.

Albertus Magnus mentions red, white, and black varieties. 17th century botanist Nicholas Culpeper noted "chick-pease or cicers" are less "windy" than peas and more nourishing. Ancient people also associated chickpeas with Venus because they were said to offer medical uses such as increasing semen and milk production, inducing menstruation and urination, and helping to treat kidney stones. "White cicers" were thought to be especially strong and helpful.

In 1793, ground-roasted chickpeas were noted by a German writer as a substitute for coffee in Europe. In the First World War, they were grown for this use in some areas of Germany. They are still sometimes brewed instead of coffee.

Genome sequencing
Sequencing of the chickpea genome has been completed for 90 chickpea genotypes, including several wild species. A collaboration of 20 research organizations, led by the International Crops Research Institute for the Semi-Arid Tropics (ICRISAT),  sequenced CDC Frontier, a kabuli chickpea variety, and identified more than 28,000 genes and several million genetic markers.

Description

The plant grows to 20–50 cm (8–20 in) high and has small, feathery leaves on either side of the stem. Chickpeas are a type of pulse, with one seedpod containing two or three peas. It has white flowers with blue, violet, or pink veins.

Dozens of varieties of chickpea are cultivated throughout the world. In general, American and Iranian chickpeas are sweeter than Indian chickpeas. Kermanshah chickpeas in sizes 8 and 9 are considered among the world's highest quality.

Regional cultivation

Desi chana
Desi chana as it is known in north India or as Boot in Eastern India (Assam, parts of Bihar), has small, darker seeds and a rough coat. They are grown mostly in  India and other parts of the Indian subcontinent, as well as in Ethiopia, Mexico, and Iran. Desi means "country" or "native" in Hindi; its other names include kala chana ("black chickpea" in Hindi) or chholaa boot or Boot in Assamese. Desi chana can be black, green or speckled. This variety is hulled and split to make chana dal, Kurukshetra Prasadam (channa laddu), and Bootor Daali.

White chickpea/garbanzo/kabuli chana
Garbanzo beans or 'kabuli' chana are lighter-coloured, larger, and with a smoother coat and are mainly grown in the Mediterranean, Southern Europe, Northern Africa, South America, and the Indian subcontinent. Kabuli chana means "from Kabul" in Hindi. This variety was thought to come from Kabul, Afghanistan, when it was introduced to India in the 18th century.

Ceci neri
An uncommon black chickpea, ceci neri, is grown only in Apulia and Basilicata, in southern Italy. It is around the same size as garbanzo beans, larger and darker than the 'desi' variety.

Production

In 2020, world production of chickpeas was 15 million tonnes, led by India with 73% of the global total, and Turkey, Myanmar, and Pakistan as secondary producers (table).

Uses

Culinary

  
Chickpeas are usually rapidly boiled for 10 minutes and then simmered for longer. Dried chickpeas need a long cooking time (1–2 hours) but will easily fall apart when cooked longer. If soaked for 12–24 hours before use, cooking time can be shortened by around 30 minutes.

Mature chickpeas can be cooked and eaten cold in salads, cooked in stews, ground into flour, ground and shaped in balls and fried as falafel, made into a batter and baked to make farinata or socca, or fried to make panelle. Chickpea flour is known as gram flour or besan in South Asia and is used frequently in South Asian cuisine.

In Portugal, chickpeas are one of the main ingredients in rancho, eaten with pasta, meat, or rice. They are used in other hot dishes with bacalhau and in soups, meat stews, salads mixed with tuna and vegetables, olive oil, vinegar, hot pepper and salt. In Spain, they are used cold in tapas and salads, as well as in cocido madrileño.

Hummus is the Arabic word for chickpeas, which are often cooked and ground into a paste and mixed with tahini (sesame seed paste), the blend called ḥummuṣ bi ṭaḥīna. Chickpeas are roasted, spiced, and eaten as a snack, such as leblebi. By the end of the 20th century, hummus had become commonplace in American cuisine. By 2010, 5% of Americans consumed hummus regularly, and it was present at some point in 17% of American households.

Chickpeas and Bengal grams are used to make curries. They are one of the most popular vegetarian foods in the Indian subcontinent and in diaspora communities of many other countries, served with a variety of bread or steamed rice. Popular dishes in Indian cuisine are made with chickpea flour, such as mirchi bajji and mirapakaya bajji. In India, as well as in the Levant, unripe chickpeas are often picked out of the pod and eaten as a raw snack, and the leaves are eaten as a leaf vegetable in salads. In India, desserts such as besan halwa and sweets such as mysore pak, besan barfi and laddu are made.

Chickpea flour is used to make "Burmese tofu," which was first known among the Shan people of Burma. In South Asian cuisine, chickpea flour (besan) is used as a batter to coat vegetables before deep frying to make pakoras. The flour is also used as a batter to coat vegetables and meats before frying or fried alone, such as  panelle (little bread), a chickpea fritter from Sicily. Chickpea flour is used to make the Mediterranean flatbread socca and is called panisse in Provence, southern France. It is made of cooked chickpea flour, poured into saucers, allowed to set, cut into strips, and fried in olive oil, often eaten during Lent. In Tuscany, chickpea flour (farina di ceci) is used to make an oven-baked pancake: the flour is mixed with water, oil and salt. Chickpea flour, known as kadlehittu in Kannada, is used for making sweet dish Mysorepak.

In the Philippines, chickpeas preserved in syrup are eaten as sweets and in desserts such as halo-halo. 

Ashkenazi Jews traditionally serve whole chickpeas, referred to as arbes (אַרבעס) in Yiddish, at the Shalom Zachar celebration for baby boys. The chickpeas are boiled until soft and served hot with salt and lots of ground black pepper.

Guasanas or garbanza is a Mexican chickpea street snack. The beans, while still green, are cooked in water and salt, kept in a steamer to maintain their humidity, and served in a plastic bag.

A chickpea-derived liquid (aquafaba) can be used as an egg white replacement to make meringue or ice cream, with the residual pomace used as flour.

Animal feed
Chickpeas are an energy and protein source as animal feed.

Raw chickpeas have a lower trypsin and chymotrypsin inhibitor content than peas, common beans, and soybeans. This leads to higher nutrition values and fewer digestive problems in nonruminants. Nonruminant diets can be completed with 200 g/kg of raw chickpeas to promote egg production and growth of birds and pigs. Higher amounts can be used when chickpeas are treated with heat.

Experiments have shown that ruminants grow equally well and produce an equal amount and quality of milk when soybean or cereal meals are replaced with chickpeas. Pigs show the same performance, but growing pigs experience a negative effect of raw chickpea feed; extruded chickpeas can increase performance even in growing pigs. Only young broilers (starting period) showed worse performance in poultry diet experiments with untreated chickpeas. Fish performed equally well when extruded chickpeas replaced their soybean or cereal diet. Chickpea seeds have also been used in rabbit diets.

Secondary components of legumes—such as lecithin, polyphenols, oligosaccharides; and amylase, protease, trypsin and chymotrypsin inhibitors—can lead to lower nutrient availability, and thus to impaired growth and health of animals (especially in nonruminants). Ruminants generally have less trouble digesting legumes with secondary components since they can inactivate them in the rumen liquor. Their diets can be supplemented by 300 g/kg or more raw chickpea seeds. However, protein digestibility and energy availability can be improved through treatments such as germination, dehulling, and heat. Extrusion is a very good heat technique to destroy secondary legume components since the proteins are irreversibly denatured. Overprocessing may decrease the nutritional value; extrusion leads to losses in minerals and vitamins, while dry heating does not change the chemical composition.

Nutrition

Chickpeas are a nutrient-dense food, providing rich content (20% or higher of the Daily Value, DV) of protein, dietary fiber, folate, and certain dietary minerals, such as iron and phosphorus in a 100-gram reference amount (see adjacent nutrition table). Thiamin, vitamin B6, magnesium, and zinc contents are moderate, providing 10–16% of the DV. Compared to reference levels established by the United Nations Food and Agriculture Organization and World Health Organization, proteins in cooked and germinated chickpeas are rich in essential amino acids such as lysine, isoleucine, tryptophan, and total aromatic amino acids.

A  reference serving of cooked chickpeas provides  of food energy. Cooked chickpeas are 60% water, 27% carbohydrates, 9% protein and 3% fat (table). 75% of the fat content is unsaturated fatty acids for which linoleic acid comprises 43% of the total fat.

Effects of cooking
Cooking treatments do not lead to variance in total protein and carbohydrate content. Soaking and cooking of dry seeds possibly induces chemical modification of protein-fibre complexes, which leads to an increase in crude fibre content. Thus, cooking can increase protein quality by inactivating or destroying heat-labile antinutritional factors. Cooking also increases protein digestibility, essential amino acid index, and protein efficiency ratio. Although cooking lowers concentrations of amino acids such as tryptophan, lysine, total aromatic, and sulphur-containing amino acids, their contents are still higher than proposed by the FAO/WHO reference. Raffinose and sucrose and other reducing sugars diffuse from the chickpea into the cooking water and this reduces or completely removes these components from the chickpea. Cooking also significantly reduces fat and mineral content. The B vitamins riboflavin, thiamin, niacin, and pyridoxine dissolve into cooking water at differing rates.

Germination
Germination of chickpeas improves protein digestibility, although at a lower level than cooking. Germination degrades proteins to simple peptides, improving crude protein, nonprotein nitrogen, and crude fibre content. Germination decreases lysine, tryptophan, sulphur and total aromatic amino acids, but most contents are still higher than proposed by the FAO/WHO reference pattern.

Oligosaccharides, such as stachyose and raffinose, are reduced in higher amounts during germination than during cooking. Minerals and B vitamins are retained more effectively during germination than with cooking. Phytic acids are reduced significantly, but trypsin inhibitor, tannin, and saponin reduction is less effective than cooking.

Autoclaving, microwave cooking, boiling
All treatments of cooking improve protein digestibility. Essential amino acids are slightly increased by boiling and microwave cooking compared to autoclaving and germination. Overall, microwave cooking leads to a significantly lower loss of nutrients than autoclaving and boiling.

Finally, all treatments improve protein digestibility, protein efficiency ratio, and essential amino acid index. Microwave cooking seems to be an effective method to prepare chickpeas because of its improved nutritional value and lower cooking time.

Leaves
In some parts of the world, young chickpea leaves are consumed as cooked green vegetables. Especially in malnourished populations, it can supplement important dietary nutrients because regions where chickpeas are consumed have sometimes been found to have populations lacking micronutrients. Chickpea leaves have a significantly higher mineral content than either cabbage leaves or spinach leaves. Environmental factors and nutrient availability could influence mineral concentrations in natural settings. Consumption of chickpea leaves may contribute nutrients to the diet.

Research
The consumption of chickpeas is under preliminary research for the potential to improve nutrition and affect chronic diseases.

Heat and nutrient cultivation
Agricultural yield for chickpeas is often based on genetic and phenotypic variability, which has recently been influenced by artificial selection. The uptake of macronutrients such as inorganic phosphorus or nitrogen is vital to the plant development of Cicer arietinum, commonly known as the perennial chickpea. Heat cultivation and macronutrient coupling are two relatively unknown methods used to increase the yield and size of the chickpea. Recent research has indicated that a combination of heat treatment along with the two vital macronutrients, phosphorus and nitrogen, are the most critical components to increasing the overall yield of Cicer arietinum.

Perennial chickpeas are a fundamental source of nutrition in animal feed as they are high-energy and protein sources for livestock. Unlike other food crops, the perennial chickpea can change its nutritional content in response to heat cultivation. Treating the chickpea with a constant heat source increases its protein content almost threefold. Consequently, the impact of heat cultivation affects the protein content of the chickpea itself and the ecosystem it supports. Increasing the height and size of chickpea plants involves using macronutrient fertilization with varying doses of inorganic phosphorus and nitrogen.

The level of phosphorus that a chickpea seed is exposed to during its lifecycle has a positive correlation relative to the height of the plant at full maturity. Increasing the levels of inorganic phosphorus at all doses incrementally increases the height of the chickpea plant. Thus, the seasonal changes in phosphorus soil content, as well as periods of drought that are known to be a native characteristic of the dry Middle-Eastern region where the chickpea is most commonly cultivated, have a strong effect on the growth of the plant itself. Plant yield is also affected by a combination of phosphorus nutrition and water supply, resulting in a 12% increase in crop yield.

Nitrogen nutrition is another factor that affects the yield of Cicer arietinum, although the application differs from other perennial crops regarding the levels administered on the plant. High doses of nitrogen inhibit the yield of the chickpea plant. Drought stress is a likely factor that inhibits nitrogen uptake and subsequent fixation in the roots of Cicer arietinum. The perennial chickpea's growth depends on the balance between nitrogen fixation and assimilation, which is also characteristic of many other agricultural plant types. The influence of drought stress, sowing date, and mineral nitrogen supply affect the plant's yield and size, with trials showing that Cicer arietinum differed from other plant species in its capacity to assimilate mineral nitrogen supply from the soil during drought stress. Additional minerals and micronutrients make the absorption process of nitrogen and phosphorus more available. Inorganic phosphate ions are generally attracted towards charged minerals such as iron and aluminium oxides.

Additionally, growth and yield are also limited by the micronutrients zinc and boron deficiencies in the soil. Boron-rich soil increased chickpea yield and size, while soil fertilization with zinc seemed to have no apparent effect on the chickpea yield.

Pathogens
Pathogens in chickpeas are the main cause of yield loss (up to 90%). One example is the fungus Fusarium oxysporum f.sp. ciceris, present in most of the major pulse crop-growing areas and causing regular yield damages between 10 and 15%. Many plant hosts produce heat shock protein 70s including C. arietinum. In response to F. o. ciceris Gupta et al., 2017 finds C. arietinum produces an orthologue of AtHSP70-1, an Arabidopsis HSP70.

From 1978 until 1995, the worldwide number of pathogens increased from 49 to 172, of which 35 were recorded in India. These pathogens originate from groups of bacteria, fungi, viruses, mycoplasma and nematodes and show a high genotypic variation. The most widely distributed pathogens are Ascochyta rabiei (35 countries), Fusarium oxysporum f.sp. ciceris (32 countries) Uromyces ciceris-arietini (25 countries), bean leafroll virus (23 countries), and Macrophomina phaseolina (21 countries). Ascochyta disease emergence is favoured by wet weather; spores are carried to new plants by wind and water splash.

The stagnation of yield improvement over the last decades is linked to the susceptibility to pathogens. Research started selecting favourable genes for pathogen resistance and other traits through marker-assisted selection. This method is a promising sign for the future to achieve significant yield improvements.

Gallery

See also
 Chickpeas in Nepal

References

External links

 India Pulses and Grains Association

Edible legumes
Faboideae
Founder crops
Medicinal plants of Asia
Plants described in 1753